Serra d'Espadà is a  long mountain range in the Alt Palància, Alt Millars and Plana Baixa comarcas, in the Province of Castellón, Valencian Community, Spain. Its highest point is La Ràpita (1,106 m).

Road N-234 winds its way between the Serra d'Espadà and Sierra de Javalambre reaching the coast at Sagunto and the Autopista AP-7.

Olive Oil Protected Designation of Origin (PDO)
Together with Serra Calderona, a parallel range only 25 km to the south, the Serra d'Espadà constitutes a defined ecoregion in the foothills of the Iberian System that are closest to the Mediterranean Sea coast. In many areas of the mountainsides olive trees are grown. Their olives produce excellent oil that has been awarded Protected Designation of Origin (PDO) and has been included by the global Slow Food movement in the Ark of Taste international catalogue of heritage foods in danger of extinction. This oil is marketed as Aceite de las Sierras Espadán y Calderona.

Natural Park
There are also Cork Oak forests in these mountains, as well as springs and shady ravines. The Serra d'Espadà Natural Park is located in this range. Within this well-kept park there are numerous marked paths for hikers.

Features

See also
Serra Calderona
Mountains of the Valencian Community
XYZ Line

References

External links

Parc Natural de la Serra d'Espadà
Parcs Naturals de la Comunitat Valenciana - Official List

Espada
Geography of the Province of Castellón
Alto Palancia
Alto Mijares
Plana Baixa
Espada